Zeoli is a surname. Notable people with the surname include:

Billy Zeoli (1932–2015), American evangelical leader, speaker, and media executive
Javier Zeoli (born 1962), Uruguayan footballer
Jetsunma Ahkon Lhamo (born 1949), born Alyce Louise Zeoli

See also
Zoli